Trimethylolpropane triacrylate (TMPTA) is a trifunctional acrylate ester monomer derived from trimethylolpropane, used in the manufacture of plastics, adhesives, acrylic glue, anaerobic sealants, and ink. It is useful for its low volatility and fast cure response. It has the properties of weather, chemical and  water resistance, as well as good abrasion resistance. End products include alkyd coatings, compact discs, hardwood floors, concrete polymers, Dental composites, photolithography, letterpress, screen printing, elastomers, automobile headlamps, acrylics and plastic components for the medical industry.

Other uses
As the molecule has acrylic functionality, it is capable of doing the Michael reaction with an amine. This allows its use in epoxy chemistry where its use speeds up the cure time considerably

See also
Pentaerythritol tetraacrylate
1,6-Hexanediol diacrylate

References

TRIMETHYLOLPROPANE TRIACRYLATE at chemicalland21.com
Trimethylolpropane Triacrylate at OSHA
Trimethylolpropane triacrylate CAS Number: 15625-89-5 at ntp.niehs.nih.gov

Acrylate esters
Monomers